The first Women's U.S. Cup tournament held in 1995, were joined by four teams: Australia, Norway, Chinese Taipei and USA.

Matches

Final placing

References

1995
1995 in women's association football
1995 in American women's soccer
1995–96 in Australian women's soccer
1995 in Norwegian women's football
1995 in Taiwanese football
July 1995 sports events in the United States
August 1995 sports events in the United States